Rose Beuret, born Marie Rose Beuret on 9 June, 1844 in Vecqueville (Haute-Marne) and died on 14 February, 1917 in Meudon, was a French seamstress and laundress, known to have been one of the muses and, for 53 years, the companion of Auguste Rodin, whom she married just weeks before her death in 1917.

Biography 
Beuret was born to Scholastique Clausse and Etienne Beuret, a farmer and winemaker from Haute-Marne.

Rose Beuret was a reserved and shy woman. Rodin was a serious and hard-working man, rustic in his manners and as shy as herself. They moved in together and continued their work, he as a sculptor and she as a seamstress. Beuret took care of the household work and Rodin sometimes helped her sew on buttons. On Sundays, the young lovers took long walks in the woods and the countryside near Paris.

In 1893, Rodin moved with her to Meudon, at  Scribe Road, in the House of Chiens-Loups.

Beuret gradually became Rodin's faithful companion. She assisted him in the projection and organization of his workshop and posed for him on several occasions. With her, Rodin approached the portraits of women. They had a son, Auguste-Eugène Beuret (1866-1934), whom the artist did not recognize. The son also served as a model for Rodin (Mignon, Bellone, L 'Alsacienne) and as a workshop boy. However, their relationship deteriorated during his career as a sculptor.

Despite Rodin having had numerous liaisons (Camille Claudel, Gwen John, and the American-born Duchesse de  Choiseul, from 1907 to 1912), the two married on 29 January 1917 in Meudon,  sixteen days before her death.

She was also his subject for a 1898 mask.

Filmography 
Danièle Lebrun plays Beuret in Camille Claudel (1988). Séverine Caneele portrays her in Rodin (2017).

Gallery

References

External links

1844 births
1917 deaths
Auguste Rodin
Muses
People from Haute-Marne